Taraxia ovata is a species of wildflower native to California and Oregon known by the common name goldeneggs or sun cup.

Description

This is a fleshy, taprooted perennial which often grows in clay soil. It has a wide rosette of long, alternate, feather-shaped or oval leaves which sometimes have wavy edges.

The flowers grow atop thin erect stems and are usually yellow and occasionally white, or yellow with white spots near the bases of the four spoon-shaped petals. The stamens are short compared to Camissonia.

Distribution
Among areas of occurrence are the North Coast Range of California up to elevations of 1600 feet, including Sonoma and Marin County, extending south to San Luis Obispo County.

References

External links

Calflora: Taraxia ovata
Jepson Manual Treatment (1993) University of California
Photo gallery

Onagraceae
Flora of California
Flora of Oregon
Plants described in 1840